The District of Ohio was a federal judicial district of the United States created by the Federal Judiciary Act of 1801 which consisted of the Northwest and Indiana territories.  It marks an early use of the term "Ohio" for an area of land as opposed to the long-named Ohio River before the establishment of a state of that name, but otherwise was of little long-term consequence, as the Federal Judiciary Act of 1801 was repealed the next year.

References

Defunct United States district courts
Courts and tribunals established in 1801
1801 establishments in the United States
1802 disestablishments in the United States
Courts and tribunals disestablished in 1802